Midland American English is a regional dialect or super-dialect of American English, geographically lying between the traditionally-defined Northern and Southern United States. The boundaries of Midland American English are not entirely clear, being revised and reduced by linguists due to definitional changes and several Midland sub-regions undergoing rapid and diverging pronunciation shifts since the early-middle 20th century onwards.

The currently-documented core of the Midland dialect region spans from central Ohio at its eastern extreme to central Nebraska and Oklahoma City at its western extreme. Certain areas outside the core also clearly demonstrate a Midland accent, including Charleston, South Carolina; the Texan cities of Abilene, Austin, and Corpus Christi; and central and southern Florida.

Early 20th-century dialectology was the first to identify the "Midland" as a region lexically distinct from the North and the South and later even focused on an internal division: North Midland versus South Midland. However, 21st-century studies now reveal increasing unification of the South Midland with a larger newer Southern accent region, while much of the North Midland retains a more "General American" accent. Most Americans view this as being the "accentless" American speech.

Early 20th-century boundaries established for the Midland dialect region are being reduced or revised since several previous subregions of Midland speech have since developed their own distinct dialects. Pennsylvania, the original home state of the Midland dialect, is one such area and has now formed such unique dialects as Philadelphia and Pittsburgh English.

Original and former Midland
The dialect region "Midland" was first labeled in the 1890s, but only first defined (tentatively) by Hans Kurath in 1949 as centered on central Pennsylvania and expanding westward and southward to include most of Pennsylvania, and the Appalachian regions of Kentucky, Tennessee, and all of West Virginia. A decade later, Kurath split this into two discrete subdivisions: the "North Midland" beginning north of the Ohio River valley area and extending westward into central Indiana, central Illinois, central Ohio, Iowa, and northern Missouri, as well as parts of Nebraska and northern Kansas; and the "South Midland", which extends south of the Ohio River and expands westward to include Kentucky, southern Indiana, southern Illinois, southern Ohio, southern Missouri, Arkansas, southern Kansas, and Oklahoma, west of the Mississippi River. Kurath and then later Craig Carver and the related Dictionary of American Regional English based their 1960s research only on lexical (vocabulary) characteristics, with Carver et al. determining the Midland non-existent according to their 1987 publication and preferring to identify Kurath's North Midland as merely an extension of the North and his South Midland as an extension of the South, based on some 800 lexical items.

Conversely, William Labov and his team based their 1990s research largely on phonological (sound) characteristics and re-identified the Midland area as a buffer zone between the Inland Southern and Inland Northern accent regions. In Labov et al.'s newer study, the "Midland" essentially coincides with Kurath's "North Midland", while the "South Midland" is now considered as largely a portion, or the northern fringe, of the larger 20th-century Southern accent region. Indeed, while the lexical and grammatical isoglosses encompass the Appalachian Mountains regardless of the Ohio River, the phonological boundary fairly closely follows along the Ohio River itself. More recent research has focused on grammatical characteristics and in particular a variable, possible combination of such characteristics.

The original Midland dialect region, thus, has split off into having more of a Southern accent in southern Appalachia, while, the second half of the 20th century has seen the emergence of a unique Western Pennsylvania accent in northern Appalachia (centered on Pittsburgh) as well as a unique Philadelphia accent.

Mid-Atlantic region

The dialect region of the Mid-Atlantic States—centered on Philadelphia, Pennsylvania; Baltimore, Maryland; and Wilmington, Delaware—aligns to the Midland phonological definition except that it strongly resists the cot–caught merger and traditionally has a short-a split that is similar to New York City's, though still unique. Certain vocabulary is also specific to the Mid-Atlantic dialect, and particularly to its Philadelphia sub-dialect.

Western Pennsylvania

The emerging and expanding dialect of western and much of central Pennsylvania is, for many purposes, an extension of the South Midland; it is spoken also in Youngstown, Ohio, 10 miles west of the state line, as well as Clarksburg, West Virginia. Its chief distinguishing features, however, also make it a separate dialect from the Midland one. Despite having a Northern accent in the first half of the 20th century, Erie, Pennsylvania, is the only major Northern city to change its affiliation to Midland by now using the Western Pennsylvania accent.

Phonology and phonetics

Rhoticity: Midland speech is firmly rhotic (or fully r-pronouncing), like most North American English.
This involves a vowel merger of the "short o"  (as in cot or stock) and "aw"  (as in caught or stalk) phonemes.
For this reason, one of the names for the boundary between the dialects of the Midland and the North is the "on line".
Likely inherited from Scots-Irish influence, this features ranges from D.C., Maryland, southern Pennsylvania, West Virginia, Kentucky, Arkansas, West Texas, and the Midland dialect regions within Ohio, Indiana, Illinois, Missouri, Oklahoma, and Kansas. Studied best of all in southern Pennsylvania, this feature may be declining.
The short-a phoneme, most commonly follows a General American ("continuous" and pre-nasal) distribution:  is raised and tensed toward  before nasal consonants (such as fan) but remains low  in other contexts (such as fact). An increasing number of speakers from central Ohio realize the  vowel  as open front .
Fronting of  : the phoneme  (as in goat) is fronter than in many other American accents, particularly those of the North; the phoneme is frequently realized as a diphthong with a central nucleus, approximating .
Fronting of  : among younger speakers,  (as in bug, strut, what, etc.) is shifting strongly to the front: .
Lowering of  : the diphthong  (as in face, reign, day, etc.) often has a lower nucleus than the Northern accents just above Midland region.
Phonologically, the South Midland remains slightly different from the North Midland (and more like the American South) in certain respects: its greater likelihood of a fronted , a pin–pen merger, and a  "glideless"  vowel reminiscent of the Southern U.S. accent, though  deletion in the South Midland only tends to appear before sonorant consonants: . For example, fire may be pronounced something like far. Southern Indiana is the northernmost extent of this accent, forming what dialectologists refer to as the "Hoosier Apex" of the South Midland, with the accent locally known as the "Hoosier Twang".

Grammar
Positive anymore: A common feature of the greater Midland area is so-called "positive anymore": It is possible to use the adverb anymore with the meaning "nowadays" in sentences without negative polarity, such as Air travel is inconvenient anymore, or The streets of the city are very crowded anymore.
"Need + participle": Many speakers use the construction "need + past participle". Some examples include:
The car needs washed to mean the car needs to be washed
They need repaired to mean they need to be repaired
So much still needs said to mean so much still needs to be said
To a lesser degree, a small number of other verbs have been reportedly used in this way too, such as The baby likes cuddled or She wants prepared. As seen in these examples, it is also acceptable to use this construction with the words want and like.
"All the + comparative": Speakers throughout the Midland (except central and southern Illinois and especially Iowa) may use "all the [comparative form of an adjective]" to mean "as [adjective] as", when followed by a subject. Some examples include: 
I held all the tighter I could to mean I held as tight as I could
That was all the higher she could jump to mean That was as high as she could jump
This is all the more comfortable it gets to mean This is as comfortable as it gets
Alls: At the start of a sentence, "alls [subject] [verb]" can be used in place of "all that [subject] [verb]" to form a noun phrase followed by is or was. For example (with the entire clause in italics): "Alls we brought was bread" or "Alls I want to do is sing a song". This has been especially well-studied in southern Ohio, though it is widespread throughout the nation.
Many other grammatical constructions are also reported to varying degrees, predominantly of Scots-Irish origin, that could hypothetically define a Midland dialect, such as: what-all (an alternative to what), wakened (an alternative to woke or woke up), sick at the stomach, quarter till (as in quarter till two to mean the time 1:45), and whenever to mean when (e.g. I cheered last Saturday whenever I won the award).

Vocabulary
bank(ed) barn, particularly in the East Midland (Indiana, Ohio, and Pennsylvania), for a barn built into a hill with two-level access
berm, in the East Midland (Indiana, Ohio, and Pennsylvania), and parking, in Iowa and Kansas, for a road verge
blinds for window shutters
carry-in, in the East Midland (Illinois, Indiana, and Ohio), for potluck
carry-out for take-out
chuckhole, particularly in the East Midland (Indiana and Ohio), and chughole, in the South Midland, for pothole
crawdad for crayfish
dope, in Ohio, for dessert sauce
mango (or mango pepper) for green bell pepper, often when pickled or stuffed
pop in Kansas, Nebraska, Iowa, western Missouri, northeastern Oklahoma, central Illinois, northern Indiana, Ohio, and Pennsylvania; soda, in eastern Missouri and southern Illinois; and coke in the Indianapolis metropolitan area, southwestern Indiana, and the Oklahoma City metropolitan areasack for any disposable bagtennis shoes for any generic athletic shoes (running shoes in Cincinnati)
Today, the Midland is considered a transitional dialect region between the South and Inland North; however, the "South Midland" is a sub-region that phonologically speaking fits more with the South and even employs some Southern vocabulary, for example, favoring y'all as the plural of you, whereas the rest of the (North) Midland favors you guys. Another possible Appalachian and South Midland variant is you'uns (from you ones), though it remains most associated with Western Pennsylvania English.

Charleston
Today, the city of Charleston, South Carolina, clearly has all the defining features of a mainstream Midland accent. Also, the older, more traditional Charleston accent was extremely "non-Southern" in sound (as well as being highly unique), spoken throughout the South Carolina and Georgia Lowcountry, but it mostly faded out of existence in the first half of the 20th century.

Cincinnati
Older English speakers of Cincinnati, Ohio, have a phonological pattern quite distinct from the surrounding area (Boberg and Strassel 2000), while younger speakers now align to the general Midland accent. The older Cincinnati short-a system is unique in the Midland.  While there is no evidence for a phonemic split, the phonetic conditioning of short-a in conservative Cincinnati speech is similar to and originates from that of New York City, with the raising environments including nasals (m, n, ŋ), voiceless fricatives (f, unvoiced th, sh, s), and voiced stops (b, d, g).  Weaker forms of this pattern are shown by speakers from nearby Dayton and Springfield.  Boberg and Strassel (2000) reported that Cincinnati's traditional short-a system was giving way among younger speakers to a nasal system similar to those found elsewhere in the Midland and the West.

St. Louis corridor
St. Louis, Missouri, is historically one among several (North) Midland cities, but it has developed some unique features of its own distinguishing it from the rest of the Midland. The area around St. Louis has been in dialectal transition throughout most of the 1900s until the present moment. This merger has led to jokes referring to "I farty-far", although a more accurate eye spelling would be "I farty-four".

Since the mid-1900s (namely, in speakers born from the 1920s to 1940s), however, a newer accent arose in a dialect "corridor" essentially following historic U.S. Route 66 in Illinois (now Interstate 55 in Illinois) from Chicago southwest to St. Louis. Speakers of this modern "St. Louis Corridor"—including St. Louis, Fairbury, and Springfield, Illinois—have gradually developed more features of the Inland North dialect, best recognized today as the Chicago accent. This 20th-century St. Louis accent's separating quality from the rest of the Midland is its strong resistance to the cot–caught'' merger and the most advanced development of the Northern Cities Vowel Shift (NCS). In the 20th century, Greater St. Louis therefore became a mix of Midland accents and Inland Northern (Chicago-like) accents.

Even more complicated, however, there is evidence that these Northern sound changes are reversing for the younger generations of speakers in the St. Louis area, who are re-embracing purely Midland-like accent features, though only at a regional level and therefore not including the aforementioned traditional features of the eldest generation. According to a UPenn study, the St. Louis Corridor's one-generation period of embracing the NCS was followed by the next generation's "retreat of NCS features from Route 66 and a slight increase of NCS off of Route 66", in turn followed by the most recent generations' decreasing evidence of the NCS until it disappears altogether among the youngest speakers. Thus, due to harboring two different dialects in the same geographic space, the "Corridor appears simultaneously as a single dialect area and two separate dialect areas".

Texas
Rather than a proper Southern accent, several cities in Texas can be better described as having a Midland U.S. accent, as they lack the "true" Southern accent's full  deletion and the oft-accompanying Southern Vowel Shift. Texan cities classifiable as such specifically include Abilene, Austin, San Antonio and Corpus Christi. Austin, in particular, has been reported in some speakers to show the South Midland (but not the Southern) variant of  deletion mentioned above.

References

Bibliography
 

 

American English
Ohio culture
Nebraska culture
Oklahoma culture